The men's 100 metres freestyle at the 2018 World Para Swimming European Championships was held at the National Aquatic Centre in Dublin from 13 to 19 August.  10 classification finals are held in all over this event.

Medalists

See also
List of IPC world records in swimming

References

100 metres freestyle